Marcelino Colín (born 2 June 1961) is a Mexican racewalker. He competed in the men's 20 kilometres walk at the 1984 Summer Olympics.

References

1961 births
Living people
Athletes (track and field) at the 1984 Summer Olympics
Mexican male racewalkers
Olympic athletes of Mexico
Place of birth missing (living people)
20th-century Mexican people